The men's Greco-Roman bantamweight competition at the 1936 Summer Olympics in Berlin took place from 6 August to 9 August at the Deutschlandhalle. Nations were limited to one competitor. This weight class was limited to wrestlers weighing up to 56kg.

This Greco-Roman wrestling competition continued to use the "bad points" elimination system introduced at the 1928 Summer Olympics, with a slight modification. Each round featured all wrestlers pairing off and wrestling one bout (with one wrestler having a bye if there were an odd number). The loser received 3 points if the loss was by fall or unanimous decision and 2 points if the decision was 2-1 (this was the modification from prior years, where all losses were 3 points). The winner received 1 point if the win was by decision and 0 points if the win was by fall. At the end of each round, any wrestler with at least 5 points was eliminated.

Schedule

Results

Round 1

The five wrestlers who won by fall took the lead, with 0 bad points. The four other winners by decision each received 1 point. All of the losers were defeated by either fall or unanimous decision, so each received 3 points.

 Bouts

 Points

Round 2

The lead group of five was cut to two, with Lőrincz and Svensson both winning their second decision by fall to stay at 0 points. Three wrestlers finished the second round with 1 point (one win by fall and one win by decision, in either order). Hýža earned his second point with a second win by decision. Four wrestlers moved to 3 points (win by fall and loss by unanimous decision or fall). Two stayed barely alive with 4 points (win by decision and loss by unanimous decision or fall). Six were eliminated with two losses; of these, Erkmen had the best record with 5 points rather than 6 for the others due to his second loss coming via split decision.

 Bouts

 Points

Round 3

Svensson finished the round in sole possession of the lead, winning a third bout by fall to stay at 0 points. Lőrincz's third win was his first by decision, moving him to 1 point. Tojar also finished the round with 1 point, winning by fall to stay at that score. Both wrestlers who started with 4 points remained in contention, winning by fall to stay at 4 points. Three other wrestlers joined them, either losing to go from 1 point to 4 or winning by decision to go from 3 points to 4. Of that group, however, Bertoli was injured and could not continue. Three wrestlers received their second loss this round and were eliminated; Hýža was also eliminated with his first loss at 5 points (his two wins were by decision).

 Bouts

 Points

Round 4

Bertoli's withdrawal resulted in Svensson having a bye, easily keeping his 0 point record intact. Both men who started the round at 1 point took 3-point losses to move to 4 points. Of the four men who started at 4 points, Brendel and Perttunen avoided elimination by winning by falls. Sikk won, but by decision, earning his fifth point and elimination. Voigt lost and was eliminated at 7 points.

 Bouts

 Points

Round 5

The fifth round eliminated 3 out of the 5 remaining wrestlers, one of whom was safe by reason of having a bye. Brendel gave Svensson the latter man's first loss (and indeed, first points of any kind), but the former was the one eliminated after picking up a fifth point due to the win by decision. Perttunen beat Tojar, but both men needed a win by fall to stay in competition and the bout was resolved by split decision—eliminating both men. Brendel's win over Perttunen back in the second round was the tie-breaker that gave the German the bronze medal.

 Bouts

 Points

Round 6

Svensson, the man who led the group through four rounds with a flawless record took his second consecutive loss in the sixth and final round to finish with the silver medal. Lőrincz ended with a 4–1 record and the gold medal.

 Bouts

 Points

References

Wrestling at the 1936 Summer Olympics